MS Eurodam is a  for Holland America Line. Eurodam is the 80th ship to enter Holland America's service and, at 86,700 tons and carrying 2,104 passengers, she is the largest Holland America Signature-class ship, along with her sister ship . She also has dynamic positioning abilities using three  bow thrusters and two  aft mounted Azipods. Total electrical power generation is 64 MW by six diesel generators.

Service history
Eurodam was christened by Queen Beatrix of the Netherlands at Rotterdam, Netherlands on 1 July 2008 before embarking on its official 10-day maiden voyage from Copenhagen on 5 July.

In April and May, the ship operated in the Mediterranean and in Western Europe. From May to August, the ship visited the Baltic, Norway and the British Isles before embarking to Canada and New England in September and October. From late October to early April the ship traveled on alternating western and eastern Caribbean cruises.

Beginning in 2017, from May to September, the ship began operating Alaska inside passage cruises out of Seattle; from late October to early April, she travels on alternating western and eastern Caribbean out of Fort Lauderdale. Eurodam is scheduled to reposition in October 2018 and operate out of San Diego, from late October to early April, and visit Mexico, Hawaii, and the French Polynesia.

Drydock 
On 4 April 2011, Eurodam was drydocked for ten days in Freeport, Bahamas, this was the first time she had been refitted since construction in 2008.

On 20 December 2015 Eurodam re-entered service after a 14-day dry dock in the Bahamas.

Amenities 
Similar in appearance to Holland America's Vista-class vessels, Eurodam features one additional deck and several interior layout differences.

On board the vessel are five dining rooms, including The Pinnacle Grill in partnership with Le Cirque.

The main atrium features artwork designed by Vincent Jansen and throughout the ship are reproductions of famous Dutch artists.
The mainstage and theater seat 890 in the audience.

On 15 July 2017 Oprah Winfrey launched the inaugural "Share the adventure cruise" aboard Eurodam, an exclusive Holland America partnership with the Oprah Magazine O, with O Magazine-inspired activities including tai chi, meditation, an onboard O's book club, and healthy cooking demonstrations.

Eurodam set a cruise industry record by earning its 11th consecutive perfect score of 100 on a routine United States Public Health (USPH) inspection conducted by the U.S. Centers for Disease Control and Prevention (CDC) during its last unannounced CDC inspection on 14 January 2017 at homeport Port Everglades (Fort Lauderdale, Florida, US).

References

External links 

 MS Eurodam accidents & incidents from Cruise Mapper

2007 ships
Panamax cruise ships
Ships built by Fincantieri
Ships built in Venice
Ships of the Holland America Line